The 1960 Lady Wigram Trophy was a motor race held at the Wigram Airfield Circuit on 23 January 1960. It was the ninth Lady Wigram Trophy to be held and was won by Jack Brabham in the Cooper T51.

Classification

References

Lady Wigram Trophy
Lady
January 1960 sports events in New Zealand